Turon (also known as lumpiang saging (Filipino for "banana lumpia"), is a Philippine snack made of thinly sliced bananas (preferably saba or Cardaba bananas), dusted with brown sugar, rolled in a spring roll wrapper and fried till the wrapper is crisp. Turon can also include other fillings. Most commonly jackfruit (langka), but there are also recipes with sweet potato (kamote), mango (mangga), cheddar cheese and coconut (niyog).  

The word turon, though etymologically Spanish in origin, is in no relation to the Spanish candy turrón (an almond nougat confection). While turon is both crunchy and chewy, it is most commonly consumed during merienda meaning snack time or for dessert.

Turon is a popular snack and street food amongst Filipinos. These are usually sold along streets with banana cue, camote cue, and maruya. In Manila, the capital of the Philippines, turon is one of the most famous street foods. Its accessibility makes for an easy on-the-go snack.

It's been said that turon began in communities in the Philippines that were located near banana trees and crop fields. The extras would be given to locals when there was a surplus from the harvest, and eventually sold on the roadside. 

In Malabon, the term "turrón" or "turon" instead refers to a fried, lumpia-wrapper-enveloped dessert filled with sweet mung bean; while the term valencia is used for the banana-filled variety. Malabon banana turon are generally sold as valencia trianggulo, which are uniquely triangle-shaped.

It is believed the creation of turon was linked to the presence of Chinese culture in the Philippines prior to being colonized by Spain beginning in 1521. Traditional Filipino dishes like pancit were created using Chinese cooking techniques.  In actuality, there have been many inspirations within Filipino culture from Chinese culture and Spanish culture. In relation to Chinese cuisine, one of which includes spring rolls and egg rolls, Filipino cuisine includes lumpia (a savory meat and veggie-filled eggroll) and turon.

See also
Lumpiang keso
Daral (food)
Pinasugbo
Banana cue
Camote cue
Ginanggang
Maruya
Piscok

References

Philippine desserts
Street food
Snack foods
Banana dishes
Street food in the Philippines
Stuffed desserts
Deep fried foods